Hastings Ranch is a neighborhood of Pasadena, California which lies in northeast Pasadena. It is principally accessed by Sierra Madre Boulevard, Michillinda Avenue, Hastings Ranch Blvd., and Riviera Drive. Hastings Ranch is also identified by large shopping areas at its southernmost end and by a shopping center at the corner of Sierra Madre and Michillinda. Hastings Ranch is divided by Sierra Madre Blvd, north of the blvd is Upper Hastings Ranch and south is Lower Hastings Ranch. To the north of the Ranch is the San Gabriel Mountains and Mount Wilson.

History
In 1882, Charles Cook Hastings purchased  of land between Pasadena and Sierra Madre for US$7 per acre. He named his ranch "Mesa Alta Rancho" and began planting  with grape vines and constructed a mansion. Soon after he died, his son, Charles Houston Hastings, assumed responsibility for the land. He imported unusual specimens of plants and trees and populated the ranch with peacocks, pheasants, cats, dogs (32 collies) and champion horses. In 1928, the Hastings mansion caught fire and burned to the ground. The ranch fell into a state of disrepair and its operation was left to managers.

Hastings Ranch was one of several competing sites for the University of California's southern campus, but lost to UCLA in 1919.

The Sierra Airdrome was an air strip at Sierra Madre Villa Avenue and Foothill Boulevard built in 1920 by the Sierra Aircraft Company of Pasadena. Currently, its location is occupied by a shopping center featuring Best Buy, Bed, Bath and Beyond and Ross Dress for Less. The airport was also known as Sierra Flying Field, Eliel Field and Hastings Airport.   The Sierra Aircraft Company of Pasadena was owned by Leon T. Eliel, a former Air Force lieutenant and  World War I aviator, and Walter Wright Alley, an airplane technician.  Along with air and mail travel, there was aerial surveys, an Eliel patented an aerial photography camera. Small planes were built at the airport also. The airport was triangular shape, with the side dimensions of 1,800 x 2,000 x 2,700 feet. Amelia Earhart flew from the airport in an air rodeo in 1924. World War I flying ace, Bogart Rogers, also flew from the airport. The Sierra Airdrome closed in 1929.

Following the death of Charles Houston Hastings in 1942, the ranch was sold by the Hastings Foundation to a syndicate for over $1 million. The land was subdivided into luxury housing tracts. Hired by Coronet Construction Co. / Coronet Homes, Inc. in the late 1940s, Edward H. Fickett, FAIA was brought in to design the three subdivided tracts.  The construction was completed in three phases, including 600 homes in the Lower Hastings tract completed in 1950, 480 homes in the Middle Hastings tract completed in 1950, along with 800 homes Fickett built in 1951 in the Upper Hastings Ranch area.

Hastings Ranch Shopping Center, located on the north side of Foothill Boulevard Between Rosemead Boulevard and Michillinda Avenue, opened in 1960 with an expansion in 1984. It is home to Marshalls, Whole Foods Market, CVS Pharmacy, Rite Aid Pharmacy (formerly Thrifty Drugs), Sears (closed in 2021), and Vromans Bookstore.

With the post war growth of the 1950s, a drive-in theater was established at the lowest point of the neighborhood between Rosemead and Foothill Boulevards by the name of Hastings Drive-In Theater. It fell to heavy commercial development in the 1960s. The drive-in was replaced by the "Hastings Theater," which opened in 1968. The theater was a part of the Pacific Theatres chain, until it closed in 2008, and was replaced by LA Fitness. Mann Theaters opened a competing three-screen movie theater in Hastings Ranch in March, 1975 (premiering with The Towering Inferno), which closed in 2002 to be replaced by Trader Joe's.

Today Hastings Ranch is defined locally as two independent neighborhoods: "Upper Hastings" and "Lower Hastings," with Sierra Madre Boulevard dividing the two.

The Lariat is the bimonthly newsletter published for the residents of Upper Hastings Ranch.  The newsletter contains information about the neighborhood, as well as publicizing essays by young residents.

Films made in the Hastings Ranch area include 1978's The Jerk with Steve Martin (the gas station scene was filmed on the southwest corner of Greenhill Avenue and Rosemead Boulevard, now a Carl's Jr. fast food restaurant).  A once-popular BMX track in a vacant lot next to Field Elementary School, frequented by neighborhood children (including the Van Halen brothers), was leveled in 1976 to make room for the "Sunrise Campus" of "First Church of the Nazarene."  The complex was completed in 1985.

Education
Hastings Ranch is home to Don Benito Elementary School and Field Elementary School. The neighborhood is also served by Sierra Madre Middle School and Pasadena High School. La Salle High School is a private school in the area. Nearby in Sierra Madre is Alverno Heights Academy and Bethany Christian School and Preschool.

Government
Hastings Ranch is part of the Pasadena City Council's Fourth District, represented by Gene Masuda.

Significant Christmas display 
Upper Hastings Ranch, run by the Upper Hastings Ranch Association (UHRA) a volunteer, nonprofit HOA, has become one of the most popular areas for neighborhood outdoor Christmas displays. The practice began in 1957 whereby each block in the neighborhood would decorate their homes with some type of theme icon placed in the parkway, e.g., snowmen, Christmas trees, Santas and reindeer, Peanuts cartoon characters, etc. The tour which was taken by automobile would consist of miles of lighting and other entertaining Christmas scenarios displayed about the labyrinth of homes. Carl Hays was also a contributor.

The Hastings Ranch Christmas display took its place among the popular local venues of Christmas Tree Lane and the Balian Mansion, both in Altadena.

The original concept of the Upper Hastings Ranch Christmas Light Parade ('Parading' up and down the streets of Upper Hastings as a real estate gimmick was the basis for the idea) was the brainchild of William M. Lawson, (not to be confused with the "Bill Lawson" associated with The Pasadena Rose Parade) a well-loved and colorful local Realtor and long time resident of both Upper Hastings (1220 Rexford Avenue) and Lower Hastings (3750 Shadow Grove Road) until his death on January 3, 2004.  Lawson's idea  was to attract attention to Coronet Homes where he made his real estate career thrive through the Christmas Light Parade and through his ingenious use of aerial photography to promote the area.  The aerial photographs were transferred onto Postcards and mailed throughout the Southern California area, and as far away as New York State and there was even a Christmas issue letting people know of the annual upcoming Christmas Light Parade.  As a result of "Captain Billy('s)" efforts [a moniker later attributed to him as a result of his turning his Lower Hastings Ranch home on Shadow Grove Road into the somewhat infamous "Pasadena Maritime Museum" [infamous because of his legendary almost nightly partying during the 27 years between his second and third marriages] and for his service as a Naval Bombardier during World War II Lawson sold over 800 homes in Upper and Lower Hastings Ranch, setting records as one of the highest producing Realtors' of the era.  Originally, when the Christmas Light Display was conceived, Lawson assembled 'Block Captains" who would oversee the decorating of each home on their respective streets.  So popular was Lawson's idea that even the Jewish population of Upper Hastings joined in the decorating frenzy as they quickly realized that the celebration was not necessarily of the Christmas holiday, but of the time of year which also included Chanukah. Lawson's magic was evidenced by his ability to:  "make Coronet Homes truly special regardless of race, creed or color, religious persuasion or profession".  Of course, to the chagrin of many a covering reporter it was hard to miss the "FOR SALE" signs, while touring Coronet homes during the parade!  Homes for sale was a common situation as Upper Hastings Ranch during that period (the late 1950s through the 1969 Moon Landing was the pinnacle of the Space Race) and Upper Hastings boasted more nearby Jet Propulsion Laboratory Engineers and Caltech Professors as residents than any other neighborhood in Southern California.  In fact, the average tenure of a JPL engineer was 8 months which accounted for the high turnover in Coronet Homes a fact not lost on Lawson.  The idea garnered widespread attention by just about every local and regional newspaper, radio and television station - traditions which continue to this day.  Many believe that this was one of, if not Southern California's, first organized Christmas Light displays of scale and shortly thereafter, another local Realtor named Howard B. Lawson [William's Uncle and long time member of the Newport Harbor Yacht Club in Newport Beach] was partially credited with revitalizing another famous Christmas Light Display, which has evolved in the Newport Harbor Festival of Lights Boat Parade.  Ask a local and they will likely tell you how growing up in Pasadena required the annual piling in the family station wagon to trek up and down the streets of the Coronet Tract in Upper Hastings to see the lights and the unique, theme-oriented decorations. Posted by Thomas C. Lawson, #3 Son of William M. Lawson

See also
Benjamin Davis Wilson

Transportation
The neighborhood overall is served by Metro Local line 256; Pasadena Transit routes 60 with connection to the Metro Gold Line terminal complex on Sierra Madre Villa Avenue and Foothill Boulevard. Near by City of Sierra Madre offers transportation on a Gateway bus. Metro Local line 268 runs from Sierra Madre Villa Station to the El Monte Station. Metro Express Line 487 runs from downtown Los Angeles Union Station to the Sierra Madre Villa Station via San Gabriel Boulevard.

Notes
Pasadena Heritage Org Running with History - Mile 23: Sierra Madre Line
USC Digital Library, View of Pacific Electric car 401 at the intersection of Baldwin Avenue and Sierra Madre Boulevard in Sierra Madre, 1908
Pacific Electric Sierra Madre Line, by the Electric Railway Historic Association of Southern California.

References

External links
 Pasadena city council - district 4 
 Upper Hastings Ranch Association
Upper Hastings Ranch Facebook page
Hastings Branch Library

Neighborhoods in Pasadena, California